The Long Island Suburban Football Association was a league-style amateur competition involving the association football teams of 12 athletic clubs in Brooklyn and Queens, New York. It was to be an annual event but only lasted one season, 1895. The competition started on 13 January 1895 and concluded on 2 June 1895. Most games were played on Sunday. On Washington's Birthday (22 February), which fell on a Friday that year, each team played two games. Two games were also played on Decoration Day (now called Memorial Day), which fell on a Thursday that year (30 May).

This was not a simple home and home series. Some teams played each other only once or not at all. Some teams played each other multiple times. Two teams played each other 11 times.

Schedule and Results

Round 1

Round 2

Round 3

Round 4

Round 5

Round 6

Round 7

Round 8

Round 9

Round 10

Round 11

Round 12

Round 13

Round 14

Round 15

Round 16

Round 17

Round 18

Round 19

Round 20

Round 21

Round 22

Round 23 and 24 

For reasons unknown, the league's Executive Committee ordered all the game from May 30 to be played over again the next day. The replay results have not been found.

Round 25

Final Standings 

Here are the final standings as calculated from the above matches. This includes the results from May 30.

Here are the final standings as they appeared in the New York Sun on 3 June 1895.

References 

1895 in sports in New York (state)
Defunct soccer competitions in the United States
Soccer in New York (state)